Félix Lázaro Martínez, Sch.P., (born 2 March 1936) is a Spanish-born prelate who served as the Bishop of the Roman Catholic Diocese of Ponce. Lázaro was ordained to serve as the Coadjutor Bishop of Ponce on 25 April 2002, and was elevated to bishop of the diocese on 11 June 2003.  He retired on 22 December 2015 and was succeeded by Rubén González Medina, the Bishop of Caguas.

Biography

Early life 
Felix Lázaro was born in Logroño, La Rioja, Spain, on 2 March 1936. He entered the Piarist Fathers Order, who are dedicated to education.  He was ordained a priest on 9 April 1961 by Bishop Ricardo Antonio Suriñach Carreras. In 1970, Lázaro was sent to  teach at the Pontifical Catholic University of Puerto Rico in Ponce, Puerto Rico. He later became dean of the College of the Arts and Humanities of the university.

Coadjutor Bishop and Bishop of Ponce 
Pope John Paul II appointed Lázaro as coadjutor bishop of the Diocese of Ponce on 20 March 2002.  He was consecrated on 25 April 2002 by Bishop Suriñach. Upon the retirement of Suriñach on 11 June 2003, Lázaro automatically succeeded him as bishop.

On 12 December 2013, Lázaro was added to the list of illustrious Ponce citizens at a ceremony at the Park of the Illustrious Ponce Citizens in Tricentennial Park in Ponce.

On 22 December 2015, Pope Francis accepted Lázaro's resignation as bishop of Ponce.

See also

 Catholic Church hierarchy
 Catholic Church in the United States
 Historical list of the Catholic bishops of Puerto Rico
 Historical list of the Catholic bishops of the United States
 List of Catholic bishops of the United States
 Lists of patriarchs, archbishops, and bishops

References

External links
 Roman Catholic Diocese of Ponce (Official Site in Spanish)

1936 births
Living people
People from Logroño
Piarists
Spanish emigrants to Puerto Rico
Spanish Roman Catholic missionaries
Pontifical Catholic University of Puerto Rico faculty
Clergy from Ponce
21st-century Roman Catholic bishops in Puerto Rico
Bishops appointed by Pope John Paul II
Roman Catholic bishops of Ponce